A. W. "Nan" Rae (born 13 January 1944) is a Scottish former competitive swimmer.

Swimming career
She won a bronze medal in the women's 400-metre freestyle at the 1958 European Aquatics Championships.  She finished sixth in the same event at the 1960 Summer Olympics in Rome.

She won the 1961 ASA National Championship 220 yards freestyle title and the 440 yards freestyle.

References

1944 births
Living people
Sportspeople from Motherwell
Scottish female freestyle swimmers
Olympic swimmers of Great Britain
British female swimmers
Scottish female swimmers
Swimmers at the 1960 Summer Olympics
Commonwealth Games competitors for Scotland
Swimmers at the 1958 British Empire and Commonwealth Games
European Aquatics Championships medalists in swimming